The Wind Is My Lover is a novel by Swedish author Viktor Rydberg. The novel was first published in the calendar Aurora in 1857, with the subtitle "Romantic fairytale poem" ("Romantisk sagodikt"). In 1865 the novel was first published as a book but with a reworked happy ending.

The novel was adapted first as an opera in 1940 by Gunnar de Frumerie, then as a film as Singoalla in 1949.

References

1865 Swedish novels
Swedish novels adapted into films
Swedish-language novels
Novels by Viktor Rydberg
Novels adapted into operas